Tarbela or Torbela is one of the 44 union councils, administrative subdivision, of Haripur District in the Khyber Pakhtunkhwa province of Pakistan. The name comes from the words tor (Pashto for "black") and bela (Punjabi/Hindko for "forest").

Khalabat township is divided into four sectors: Sectors 1 and 2 are called Tarbela union; sectors 3 and 4 are called Khalabat union council.

Nearby Tarbela Dam got its name from this Tarbela.

Festival
On 1st Baisakh (April 11), the Hindu residents in the vicinity and of the Hazara plain bathe in the Indus river. The assembly is religious and lasts two days.

References

Union councils of Haripur District